The American School of Correspondence is an American distance education high school in Lansing, Illinois. It was founded in 1897.

History
The American School of Correspondence (ASC) was founded in 1897.  It was located in the Hyde Park, Chicago, neighborhood from 1912 to 1996, when it moved to south suburban Lansing.

The L. L. Cooke School of Electricity was an early correspondence course on electrical theory and practice. The course covered various topics in electrical technology from alarms to wiring. The correspondence course company was based in Chicago, and operated at least as early as 1927.  Its courses were published by the ASC.

Program
The ASC is a non-public secondary school and offers its own diploma. High school students can complete four years' worth of credits at their own pace, often taking less time than in a traditional high school. All exams in the more than 70 courses offered are hand graded by a qualified staff of full-time and part-time instructors. Additionally, the school works with thousands of public, private, and parochial schools throughout the United States to offer distance learning courses to students who have fallen behind in credits, or are working at an accelerated rate. The credits for these correspondence courses are then transferred to the student's high school.

Accreditation
It is accredited by the Middle States Association of Colleges and Schools (MSA-CESS) and the National Council for Private School Accreditation (NCPSA).

Notable alumni

Andre Agassi
Jessica Alba
Wilson Chandler
Tiffany Evans
The Everly Brothers
Bob Feller
Members of The Flying Wallendas
Archibald T. Kidd
Anna Kournikova
Donny Osmond
Marie Osmond
Christopher Paolini
Travis Pastrana
Mary Pierce
Shulamit Ran
Selena
Jamie Wyeth
Sho Yano

Notable faculty 
 James Bray Griffith

References

External links
 
 
 

Distance education institutions based in the United States
Private high schools in Illinois
Educational institutions established in 1897
1897 establishments in Illinois